Isabella de Clare (2 November 1226 – 10 July 1264) was the daughter of Gilbert de Clare, 4th Earl of Hertford and 5th Earl of Gloucester and Isabel Marshal. She is also known as Isabel de Clare, but this is however, the name of many women in her family.

Family 
Isabella's maternal grandparents were William Marshal, 1st Earl of Pembroke and his wife Isabel de Clare, 4th Countess of Pembroke. Isabella's paternal grandparents were Richard de Clare, 3rd Earl of Hertford and Amice FitzRobert.

Isabella was the fourth of six children, her brother was Richard de Clare, 6th Earl of Hertford. Her sister, Amice de Clare married Baldwin de Redvers, 6th Earl of Devon and was mother of Baldwin de Redvers, 7th Earl of Devon and Isabella de Fortibus, Countess of Devon.

Marriage 
Isabella was married on 12 May 1240 (at age thirteen and a half) to Robert de Brus, 5th Lord of Annandale. Isabella brought to him the village of Ripe, in Sussex. Her husband was a candidate to become King of Scotland, after the death of the young Margaret, Maid of Norway. Her husband did not however succeed; Robert's rival, John Balliol, was elected King of Scotland in 1292.

Robert and Isabella had up to six children:

 Robert (1243–1304)
 William, married Elizabeth de Sully, without issue
 Bernard
 Richard (died before 26 January 1287)
 Isabella (1249 – c. 1284), married (as his first wife) Sir John Fitz Marmaduke, Isabel was buried at Easington, county Durham.

John Balliol's time as King of Scotland did not last long, he died in 1314. Isabella's grandson, Robert the Bruce became King of Scotland. Isabella did not however get to see this day, she died in 1264, aged thirty seven. Her husband married a second time, to Christina de Ireby, this marriage produced no children.

Despite claims to the contrary by amateur genealogists, there is no evidence that Isabella had other children.

Ancestors

References

1226 births
1264 deaths
House of Bruce
Daughters of British earls
Ladies of Parliament
13th-century English people
13th-century English women